MS Maud (formerly MS Midnatsol) is a Hurtigruten AS vessel built by Bruces Verkstad in Sweden and Fosen mekaniske verksteder in Rissa, Norway in 2003. It is the fourth ship to sail for Hurtigruten to bear this name. She has a sister ship, which also sails for Hurtigruten. MS Midnatsol was renamed MS Maud in 2021.

History 
At 4 AM on the night of 14 December 2003, the ship was on a southbound course between Ålesund and Måløy when the main power supply failed and Midnatsol lost all engine power. The ship was approaching an underwater reef and the anchors were set out in an attempt to stop the drift, but the attempt failed. All 102 passengers were ordered to the lifeboats after an attempt to connect a towing hawser from another vessel also failed.  The situation was very critical and Midnatsol sent a Mayday message.  The ship was only  from shore when one of the anchors finally caught. Not long after, the crew managed to restart the main engines and the ship went on to Florø. The cause of the engine stoppage was an overgrown inlet to the engine's coolant systems.

In August 2004, the Norwegian Broadcasting Corporation was recording aboard MS Midnatsol for the series Hurtigruten 365. The recordings took place in one year, and the result was 20 episodes that were shown on television.

On 6 June 2015 the vessel caught fire off Vardo in Southern Norway. The fire started in one of the service rooms. The crew reacted immediately, extinguishing the fire in less than an hour. No injuries or damages were reported.

References

External links 
Sjøfartsdirektoratet Norwegian Maritime Authority, Vessel LEFO3 MAUD
Hurtigruten ASA Official homepage - MS Maud
MS Midnatsol Position
Mike Bent's Hurtigruten-pages - MS Midnatsol

Passenger ships of Norway
Ships built in Rissa, Norway
2002 ships
Merchant ships of Norway
Hurtigruten